Leucopogon elegans is a species of flowering plant in the heath family Ericaceae and is endemic to the south-west of Western Australia. It is a spreading shrub with egg-shaped leaves, and white or pink, tube-shaped flowers densely bearded on the inside.

Description
The flowers are arranged in groups of 4 to 11 on the ends of branches and in upper leaf axils with egg-shaped bracts and bracteoles at the base. Flowering mainly occurs from June to November.

Taxonomy and naming
Leucopogon elegans was first formally described in 1845 by Otto Wilhelm Sonder in Johann Georg Christian Lehmann's Plantae Preissianae. The specific epithet (elegans) means "fine" or "elegant".

In 2009, Michael Clyde Hislop described two subspecies of L. elegans in the journal Nuytsia, and the names are accepted by the Australian Plant Census:

Distribution and habitat
Subspecies elegans grows in winter-wet heath and low woodland and is common between Two Peoples Bay and Cheynes Beach, and occurs in scattered locations from there to the southern Stirling Range in the Esperance Plains and Jarrah Forest bioregions of south-western Western Australia. Subspecies psorophyllus grows in heath or mallee woodland between Wellstead, Cape Riche and the Pallinup River in the Esperance Plains bioregion.

Conservation status
Leucopogon elegans subsp. elegans is classified as "not threatened" but subsp. psorophyllus is listed as "Priority Three" by the Government of Western Australia Department of Biodiversity, Conservation and Attractions, meaning that it is poorly known and known from only a few locations but is not under imminent threat.

References

elegans
Ericales of Australia
Flora of Western Australia
Plants described in 1845
Taxa named by Otto Wilhelm Sonder